Froelichia, or snakecotton, is a genus of plants in the family Amaranthaceae.

Species include:
 Froelichia arizonica
 Froelichia chacoensis
 Froelichia drummondii
 Froelichia floridana
 Froelichia gracilis
 Froelichia humboldtiana
 Froelichia interrupta
 Froelichia juncea B.L. Rob. & Greenm.
 Froelichia nudicaulis Hook.f.
 Froelichia paraguayensis
 Froelichia procera
 Froelichia sericea
 Froelichia texana
 Froelichia tomentosa
 Froelichia xanti

References

External links
Flora of North America: North American Spp.

 
Amaranthaceae genera
Taxonomy articles created by Polbot